Nadeen Mammdoh Mohamed Wehdan (born ) is a Qatari individual trampoline gymnast, representing her nation at international competitions. 

She competed at world championships, including at the 2014 Youth Olympic Games, and the 2014 Trampoline World Championships.

References

External links

1997 births
Living people
Qatari female trampolinists
Place of birth missing (living people)
Gymnasts at the 2014 Summer Youth Olympics
Gymnasts at the 2014 Asian Games
Gymnasts at the 2018 Asian Games
Asian Games competitors for Qatar